Craddockville is an unincorporated community in Accomack County, Virginia, United States.

The Edmund Bayly House was added to the National Register of Historic Places in 1974.

References

Unincorporated communities in Virginia
Unincorporated communities in Accomack County, Virginia